Dheera is a 1982 Indian Malayalam film, directed by Joshiy and produced by Raghu Kumar. The film stars Sukumaran, Ambika, M. G. Soman and Sumalatha in the lead roles. The film has musical score by Raghu Kumar.

Cast
 
Sukumaran as Vinod 
Ambika as Indu 
M. G. Soman as Mohan 
Sumalatha as Rathi 
Srividya as Vimala Menon (Rani)
Jose Prakash as Fernandez 
Rohini as Rani (Young Vimala)
K. P. Ummer as Sankaran Nair 
Prathapachandran as Velayudhan 
Balan K Nair as Moidu, Abdulla (double role)
Janardhanan as Rajasekharan 
Cochin Haneefa as Williams 
Bhagyalakshmi as Rekha 
Jagannatha Varma as D.I.G Varma 
Radhadevi as Rajasekharan's wife 
Chandran as Raghavan 
James as Waiter 
P. R. Menon as Raped girl's father

Soundtrack
The music was composed by Raghu Kumar and the lyrics were written by Poovachal Khader.

References

External links
 

1982 films
1980s Malayalam-language films
Films scored by Raghu Kumar